The economy of Burkina Faso is based primarily on subsistence farming and livestock raising. Burkina Faso has an average income purchasing-power-parity per capita of $1,900 and nominal per capita of $790 in 2014. More than 80% of the population relies on subsistence agriculture, with only a small fraction directly involved in industry and services. Highly variable rainfall, poor soils, lack of adequate communications and other infrastructure, a low literacy rate, and a stagnant economy are all longstanding problems of this landlocked country. The export economy also remained subject to fluctuations in world prices.

The country has a high population density, few natural resources, and a fragile soil. Industry remains dominated by unprofitable government-controlled corporations. Following the African franc currency devaluation in January 1994 the government updated its development program in conjunction with international agencies, and exports and economic growth have increased. Maintenance of its macroeconomic progress depends on continued low inflation, reduction in the trade deficit, and reforms designed to encourage private investment.

The Burkinabé financial system represents 30% of the country's GDP and is dominated by the banking sector, which accounts for 90% of total financial system assets. Eleven banks and five non-bank financial institutions operate in the country.

The banking sector is highly concentrated, with the three largest banks holding nearly 60% of total financial sector assets. Banks are generally adequately capitalized, but remain vulnerable due to their overexposure to the cotton sector, the prices of which are subject to significant oscillations.

A December 2018 report from the World Bank indicates that cotton had become the most important cash crop, while gold exports were increasing in recent years. In 2017, economic growth increased to 6.4% in 2017 (vs. 5.9% in 2016) primarily due to gold production and increased investment in infrastructure. The increase in consumption linked to growth of the wage bill also supported economic growth. Inflation remained low, 0.4% that year but the public deficit grew to 7.7% of GDP (vs. 3.5% in 2016). The government was continuing to get financial aid and loans to finance the debt. To finance the public deficit, the Government combined concessional aid and borrowing on the regional market. The World Bank said that the economic outlook remained favorable in the short and medium term, although that could be negatively impacted. Risks included high oil prices (imports), lower prices of gold and cotton (exports) as well as terrorist threat and labour strikes.

Macro-economic trend
This is a chart of trend of gross domestic product of Burkina Faso at market prices estimated by the International Monetary Fund with figures in millions of CFA Francs.

For purchasing power parity comparisons, the US Dollar is exchanged at 470.70 CFA Francs only. Mean wages were $0.56 per man-hour in 2009.

Current GDP per capita of Burkina Faso grew 13% in the Sixties reaching a peak growth of 237% in the Seventies. But this proved unsustainable and growth consequently scaled back to 23% in the Eighties. Finally, it shrank by 37% in the Nineties. Average wages in 2007 hover around 2 to 3 dollars per day.

Although disadvantaged by an extremely resource-deprived domestic economy, Burkina Faso remains committed to the structural adjustment program it launched in 1991. It has largely recovered from the devaluation of the CFA in January 1994, with a 1996 growth rate of 5.9%.

Many Burkinabé migrate to neighbouring countries for work, and their remittances provide a substantial contribution to the balance of payments. Burkina Faso is attempting to improve the economy by developing its mineral resources, improving its infrastructure, making its agricultural and livestock sectors more productive and competitive, and stabilizing the supplies and prices of cereals.

The agricultural economy remains highly vulnerable to fluctuations in rainfall. The Mossi Plateau in north central Burkina Faso faces encroachment from the Sahara. The resultant southward migration means heightened competition for control of very limited water resources south of the Mossi Plateau. Most of the population ekes out a living as subsistence farmers, living with problems of climate, soil erosion, and rudimentary technology. The staple crops are pearl millet, sorghum, maize, and rice. The cash crops are cotton, groundnuts, karite (shea nuts), and sesame. Livestock, once a major export, has declined.

A 2018 report by the African Development Bank Group discussed a macroeconomic evolution: "higher investment and continued spending on social services and security that will add to the budget deficit". This group's prediction for 2018 indicated that the budget deficit would be reduced to 4.8% of GDP in 2018 and to 2.9% in 2019. Public debt associated with the National Economic and Social Development Plan was estimated at 36.9% of GDP in 2017.

Agriculture

Burkina Faso produced in 2018:

 1.9 million tons of sorghum;
 1.7 million tons of maize;
 1.1 million tons of millet;
 630 thousand tons of cowpea (3rd largest producer in the world, preceded only by Niger and Nigeria);
 490 thousand tons of sugar cane;
 482 thousand tons of cotton;
 329 thousand tons of peanut;
 253 thousand tons of sesame seed (8th largest producer in the world);
 240 thousand tons of vegetable;
 160 thousand tons of rice;
 103 thousand tons of cashew nuts (12th largest producer in the world);

In addition to smaller productions of other agricultural products.

External trade

Industry, still in an embryonic stage, is located primarily in Bobo-Dioulasso, Ouagadougou, Banfora, and Koudougou. Manufacturing is limited to food processing, textiles, and other import substitution heavily protected by tariffs. Some factories are privately owned, and others are set to be privatized. Burkina Faso's exploitable natural resources are limited, although a manganese ore deposit is located in the remote northeast. Gold mining has increased greatly since the mid-1980s and, along with cotton, is a leading export moneyearner. However, both gold and cotton are listed as goods produced mostly by child labor and forced labor according to a recent U.S. Department of Labor report.

See also

Agriculture in Burkina Faso
List of companies based in Burkina Faso
United Nations Economic Commission for Africa
List of banks in Burkina Faso

References

External links
 
 West African Agricultural Market Observer/Observatoire du Marché Agricole  (RESIMAO), a project of the West-African Market Information Network (WAMIS-NET), provides live market and commodity prices from fifty seven regional and local public agricultural markets across Benin, Burkina Faso, Côte d'Ivoire, Guinea, Niger, Mali, Senegal, Togo, and Nigeria.  Sixty commodities are tracked weekly. The project is run by the Benin Ministry of Agriculture, and a number of European, African, and United Nations agencies.
 Burkina Faso latest trade data on ITC Trade Map

 
Burkina Faso
Burkina Faso